Martin Fischer and Philipp Oswald were the defending champions but decided not to participate this year.Flavio Cipolla and Alessio di Mauro won the final against Marcel Granollers and Gerard Granollers-Pujol 6–1, 6–4.

Seeds

Draw

Draw

External links
 Main Draw

Blu-express.com Tennis Cup - Doubles
Internazionali di Tennis Città dell'Aquila